Malatesta may refer to:

People
House of Malatesta, an Italian family which ruled over Rimini from the thirteenth to the fifteenth century

Given name
Malatesta (I) da Verucchio (1212–1312), founder of the powerful Italian Malatesta family and a famous condottiero
Malatesta II Malatesta, best known as Guastafamiglia (c. 1299–1364), Italian condottiero and lord of Rimini.
Malatesta III Malatesta or Malatesta IV Malatesta (also known as Malatesta dei Sonetti); (1370–1429), Italian condottiero, poet and lord
Malatesta IV Baglioni (1491–1531), Italian condottiero and lord of Perugia, Bettona, Spello and other lands in Umbria

Surname
Antonia Malatesta of Cesena, daughter (or possibly the niece) of Carlo I Malatesta, Lord of Cesena, Fano, Pesaro, and Rimini
Carlo I Malatesta (1368–1429), Italian condottiero
Enrico Malatesta (born 1976), Italian goalkeeper for Cremonese
Errico Malatesta (1853–1932), Italian anarchist
Guido Malatesta (1919–1970), Italian film director and screenwriter
Malatestino Malatesta (died 1317) or Malatestino (II) Malatesta, known as dell'Occhio, lord of Pesaro and Rimini
Malatesta II Malatesta, best known as Guastafamiglia (c. 1299–1364), Italian condottiero and lord of Rimini.
Malatesta IV Malatesta (also known as Malatesta dei Sonetti); (1370–1429), Italian condottiero, poet and lord
Sigismondo Pandolfo Malatesta (1417–1468), Italian nobleman and poet
Simone Malatesta (born 1982), Italian footballer for Lupa Roma

Other
Malatesta (play), a play by Henry de Montherlant
Malatesta (film), a 1970 German film
Malatesta (Rome Metro), underground station of Line C of the Rome Metro

Italian-language surnames